This is the list of all K-1 champions. Included are the K-1 World Grand Prix and K-1 World MAX champions as well as all the preliminary tournament winners from the events promoted by K-1 and FEG (1993-2011) and later by K-1 Global (2012–present) following the former's dissolution. The list does not contain K-1's mixed martial arts branch Hero's and DREAM champions.

K-1 Championship

K-1 Super Heavyweight Championship
Weight limit: Unlimited

K-1 Heavyweight Championship
Weight limit:

K-1 Cruiserweight Championship
Weight limit:

K-1 Super Welterweight Championship
Weight limit: 
Formerly known as Welterweight until 2016.

K-1 Welterweight Championship
Weight limit:

K-1 World GP Super Lightweight Championship
Weight limit: 
Formerly known as Lightweight until 2016.

K-1 Lightweight Championship
Weight limit:

K-1 Super Featherweight Championship
Weight limit:

K-1 Featherweight Championship
Weight limit:

K-1 Super Bantamweight Championship
Weight limit:

K-1 Bantamweight Championship
Weight limit:

K-1 Women's Flyweight Championship
Weight limit:

K-1 Women's Atomweight Championship
Weight limit:

K-1 World Grand Prix Champions

K-1 World Grand Prix Tables

K-1 World GP Preliminary / Other Tournament Champions

K-2 Grand Prix Champions

K-3 Grand Prix Champions

K-1 World MAX Champions

K-1 World MAX Preliminary / Other Tournament Champions

K-1 World GP in Japan Champions

K-1 Japan Champions

K-1 World GP -65kg Japan Tournament Champions

K-1 Japan -63kg Tournament Champions

K-1 World GP -60kg Japan Tournament Champions

K-1 Japan -57kg Tournament Champions

K-1 Japan -53kg Tournament Champions

K-1 Japan Amateur Champions

K-1 Japan Koshien Tournament Champions

K-1 Japan Koshien Preliminary Tournament Champions

K-1 Japan Amateur All Japan A-class Champions

See also
 List of K-1 events
 List of HERO's events
 List of PRIDE events
 List of male kickboxers

References

Champions
Lists of sportspeople
Champions
Lists of martial artists